Cultural diversity is stated “as necessary for humankind as biodiversity is for nature”. According to every country's life style and culture specifically of folk communities communication differs place to place, we could see the difference in gestures also. As an example we can take Indian way of communication. As one of the biggest populated nation, India has a large diversity in its culture. Though it keeps a unity in its diversity-art, architecture, art forms  and culture communicate the standard of living, knowledge, development, technology and imagination of a community. Those factors play a major role in these forms of communication. Culture influences the thinking process of people also. Culture of a person is inherited from his ancestors through gene transitions and he will  be showing signs of his traditional heritage and ancestral habits. That is why there is a similarity with the profiles of parents and children in major cases regarding their education and career. It is similar in case of countries also. The countries like USA which is well advanced in technology and research gets more and more advanced in the next generation also because there is an unconscious cultural, technical, mental and intellectual communication communicated from one to another. The influence of mother tongue is very obvious in the English accent of the people in India and it is known as Indian accent in India, in other countries there are different kinds of accents like Korean, German, Italian, Spanish, Chinese, and Brazilian accents. People show their cultural and gestural differences in their style of communication. People always show a linguistic feeling and form their own communities and likes communicate with those who belongs to their own linguistic regions and makes even agitations for certain specific groups.  In India reorganisation of states were done based on linguistic differences. In certain cases different languages has different meanings too as in certain words and ideas. A unity is missing in many cases. An event or fact which is very common in a region may be totally different in meaning or understanding in another region. Therefore, it makes some hurdles in the areas such as education, and inter exchange of ideas. Therefore, applicability of anything brought from one particular region should be screened well for getting the right idea.

References

Multiculturalism
Sociolinguistics